This is a selected list of music artists who have covered or sampled one or more songs which were composed by the Italian composer Ennio Morricone. Over the past 7 decades, Ennio Morricone has composed over 500 scores for cinema and television, as well as over 100 classical works. He composes a wide range of music styles, making him one of the most versatile, experimental and influential composers of all time, working in any medium.

Many albums have been created in dedication to the composer. Ennio Morricone is considered as one of the most sampled artists of all time.
Hundreds of hip-hop backing tracks contain audio sampled from Morricone's compositions for Westerns, the Italian subgenre of thrillers, known as giallo, television series, as well as Hollywood films.

Background

Throughout his career Morricone has composed songs for several national and international pop artists including Gianni Morandi (Go Kart Twist, 1962), Alberto Lionello (La donna che vale, 1959), Edoardo Vianello (Ornella, 1960; Cicciona cha-cha, 1960; Faccio finta di dormire, 1961; T'ho conosciuta, 1963), Nora Orlandi (Arianna, 1960), Jimmy Fontana (Twist no. 9; Nicole, 1962), Rita Pavone (Pel di carota from 1962, arranged by Luis Bacalov), Catherine Spaak (Penso a te; Questi vent'anni miei, 1964), Luigi Tenco (Quello che conta; Tra tanta gente; 1962), Gino Paoli (Nel corso from 1963, written by Morricone with Paoli), Renato Rascel (Scirocco, 1964), Paul Anka (Ogni Volta), Amii Stewart, Rosy Armen (L'Amore Gira), Milva (Ridevi, Metti Una Sera A Cena), Françoise Hardy (Je changerais d'avis, 1966), Mireille Mathieu (Mon ami de toujours; Pas vu, pas pris, 1971; J'oublie la pluie et le soleil, 1974) and Demis Roussos (I Like The World, 1970).

Another particular success was his composition, "Se telefonando", performed by Mina. The song was covered by several performers in Italy and abroad most notably by Françoise Hardy and Iva Zanicchi (1966), Delta V (2005), Vanessa and the O's (2007), and Neil Hannon (2008).

In 1987 Morricone co-wrote 'It Couldn't Happen Here' with the Pet Shop Boys. Other notable compositions for international artists include: La metà di me and Immagina (1988) by Ruggero Raimondi, Libera l'amore (1989) performed by Zucchero, Love Affair (1994) by k.d. lang, Ha fatto un sogno (1997) by Antonello Venditti, Di Più (1997) by Tiziana Tosca Donati, Come un fiume tu (1998), Un Canto (1998) and Conradian (2006) by Andrea Bocelli, Ricordare (1998) and Salmo (2000) by Angelo Branduardi and My heart and I (2001) by Sting.

A tribute album entitled, We All Love Ennio Morricone was released in 2007 in his honor.

Selected list

Artists who have covered or sampled Morricone's compositions include:

Film composers
 Luis Bacalov
 Marco Beltrami
 Michel Colombier
 Carl Davis
 Alexandre Desplat
 Anne Dudley
 Harry Gregson-Williams
 Alan Howarth
 Hugo Montenegro
 Michiko Naruke
 Gustavo Santaolalla
 Hans Zimmer

Jazz musicians/singers
 Karrin Allyson
 Chris Botti
 Al Caiola
 Herbie Hancock
 Quincy Jones
 Dave Koz
 John Zorn

Classical musicians/singers
 Susanna Rigacci
 Andrea Bocelli
 Escala
 Il Volo
 Renée Fleming
 Josh Groban
 Katherine Jenkins
 Yo-Yo Ma
 Fausto Papetti
 Dulce Pontes
 André Rieu

Pop artists
 Paul Anka
 Sarah Brightman
 Céline Dion 
 Dalida
 Erasure
 Jovanotti
 Michael Jackson feat. Slash
 Mireille Mathieu
 Milva
 Mina
 Georges Moustaki
 Gianni Morandi
 Rita Pavone
 Patty Pravo
 The Sandpipers
 Amii Stewart
 The Wanted
 Hayley Westenra

Rock artists
 Alvarius B. 
 Babe Ruth
 Big Audio Dynamite
 Bruce Springsteen
 Calibro 35
 Fantômas
 The Golden Palominos
 Goldrush
 Hank Marvin
 Cibo Matto
 Metallica
 The Mars Volta
 Monkey3
 Muse
 Mike Patton
 Nanowar of Steel
 The Pogues
 The Ramones
 Revolting Cocks
 Kid Rock
 The Shadows
 Sin City Sinners
 The Vandals
 The Ventures

Hip hop/Soul/Reggae artists
 Atmosphere
 DJ Babu
 Joey Badass
 Bad Balance
 Big Lurch
 Bone Thugs-n-Harmony
 Bounty Killer
 Busta Rhymes
 Cameo
 Compton's Most Wanted
 Coolio
 Depth Charge
 Dreadzone
 Eminem
 EPMD
 G-Unit
 Gorillaz
 GZA
 Immortal Technique
 Jay-Z
 LL Cool J
 Mack 10
 MC Hammer
 MC Solaar
 Method Man
 Mobb Deep
 Necro
 Raekwon
 Sadat X
 Shinehead
 Slick Rick
 Snoop Dogg
 Stereo MCs
 Suga Free
 Wu-Tang Clan

Electronic/Dance artists
 Amon Tobin
 Apollo 440
 Bomb the Bass
 Coldcut
 Beats International
 Deee-Lite
 Dr. Kucho!
 Ed Starink
 Fantastic Plastic Machine
 Flying Lotus
 The Future Sound of London
 Goldfrapp
 Jigsy King
 Jonzun Crew
 Massive Attack
 Norman Cook
 The Orb 
 Thievery Corporation
 Pierre Henry
 Planet Funk
 The Prodigy

MPB artists
 Aymoréco

See also 
 List of compositions by Ennio Morricone

References

External links 
 
 Ennio Morricone at Soundtrackguide.net
 Ennio Morricone (Unofficial) Fans Club
 The Ennio Morricone Fanpage
 Ennio Morricone Myspace
 The Ennio Morricone Online Community
 Ennio Morricone Japanese website
 
 Ennio Morricone Discography at SoundtrackCollector.com

Cover versions
Lists of compositions by composer
Dynamic lists of songs
Morricone